The Bhutto family is a prominent political family and among the most powerful families in Pakistan, based in the Pakistani province of Sindh. The Bhuttos have played a prominent role in Pakistani politics and government. The family has held the leadership of the Pakistan People's Party (PPP), since its inception in 1967. The Bhuttos are based in Sindh province. The Bhuttos have been settled in the area for over three centuries.

Two members of the family, Zulfikar and Benazir Bhutto, have been the Prime Ministers of Pakistan, whereas Asif Ali Zardari, Benazir's widower served as the President of Pakistan, from 2008 to 2013.

History
According to historian Stanley Wolpert, the Bhuttos were Rajputs who originally migrated to Sindh in the early 18th century from the neighboring region of Rajputana (now Rajasthan in India). 'Sehto' was the first member of the Bhutto family, who had to convert to Islam, during Mughal emperor Aurangzeb's reign, to escape the reimposition of jizya over non-Muslims. Following the conversion to Islam he took the title of Khan, becoming Sehto Khan. In Sindh, the Bhuttos under Sehto Khan first settled at Ratodero, a few miles north of Larkana.

Shah Nawaz Bhutto, a direct descendant of Sehto Khan, came to prominence during the British Raj as a dewan of the princely state of Junagadh in the southwestern part of Gujarat in India. During the Partition of India in 1947, the Muslim Nawab of Junagarh wanted to accede his state to the newly-created Pakistan but faced a rebellion by the Hindu majority population of Junagadh. The Indian government thwarted the accession to Pakistan, and the Bhuttos had to flee to Sindh in modern-day Pakistan. Shah Nawaz Bhutto moved to Larkana District in Sindh, where his land-ownership made him one of the wealthiest and most influential persons in Sindh.

Beginning the political dynasty, Shah Nawaz's third son Zulfikar Ali Bhutto (1928-1979) founded the Pakistan People's Party (PPP) in 1967 and served as the fourth President and later the ninth Prime Minister. He married an Iranian of Kurdish origin named Nusrat Ispahani. His daughter, Benazir (1953-2007), also served as Prime Minister, while his two sons, Shahnawaz Bhutto and Mir Murtaza Bhutto, were assassinated. Shahnawaz's daughter, Sassi Bhutto and Murtaza's children, Fatima Bhutto and Zulfikar Ali Bhutto Jr., are settled abroad along with their aunt Sanam Bhutto (Zulfikar Bhutto's second daughter). After Benazir's assassination on December 27, 2007, her son Bilawal Bhutto Zardari became co-chairperson in 2007 along with her widower Asif Ali Zardari.

Family tree

 Titles

According to other authors, the family migrated from Sarsa to Hissar. 
 Founding father Doda Khan of Pir Bakhsh Bhutto
 Khuda Bakhsh Bhutto, Ameer Bakhsh Bhutto, Illahi Bux Bhutto (Honorary Magistrate Larkana District)
 Ghulam Murtaza Bhutto, Rasul Bakhsh Bhutto
 Sir Shah Nawaz Bhutto (Member Bombay Council)
 Sardar Wahid Baksh Bhutto (Member, Central Legislative Assembly and Bombay Council, Chief of tribe)
 Nawab Nabi Bakhsh Bhutto (Member, Central Legislative Assembly)
 Khan Bahadur Ahmad Khan Bhutto

Photos

See also
 Zardari family
Shia Islam

References

Further reading
 http://blai.newsvine.com/_news/2007/12/30/1193585-shah-nawaz-the-legacy-of-the-bhuttos?groupId=84

 
Pakistan People's Party politicians
Political families of Pakistan
Muslim families